The Clear Creek Courant is a weekly newspaper in Idaho Springs, Colorado, that also serves Georgetown, and Floyd Hill along the I-70 corridor. It was founded in 1973 by Cary and Carol (Willcox) Stiff, former reporters at The Denver Post. The Clear Creek Courant is particularly notable for the number of awards it has received - it has been named the best weekly in the state by the Colorado Press Association, along with more than 50 other CPA accolades, for its news coverage, columns, editorials, and general excellence. Further, in 1997, the papers then-editors, Stiff and Wilcox, were awarded the Eugene Cervi Memorial Award, chosen by the International Society of Weekly Newspaper Editors. The paper is now edited by Michael Hicks, who edits all Evergreen Newspapers, which owns the Clear Creek Courant and reaches 1,936 households.

References 

Weekly newspapers published in the United States
Clear Creek County, Colorado
Publications established in 1973